Guan Linzheng (1905–1980) was a highly successful Chinese general in the Kuomintang who fought against both the Communists and the Imperial Japanese Army, and was a recipient of Order of Blue Sky and White Sun, the highest honor for a Chinese Nationalist commander.

Early life and career
Guan Linzheng was born in a rural peasant family in Hu County, Shaanxi. Shanxi General Governor Yu Youren recommended him to join the Chinese Nationalist Party headed by Dr. Sun Yat-sen in Canton. and attended the Whampoa Military Academy, where some of his notable classmates included Du Yuming, Fan Hanjie, Hu Lien, Liu Yuzhang, Zhang Lingfu, and Lin Biao.

In 1925, Guan a member of the first graduating class the academy, he was seriously injured in his knees during the Eastern Expedition against the Cantonese warlord Chen Jiongming.

In 1926, Guan was appointed to be the battalion commander of the Central garrison regiment and participated in the Northern Expedition. In 1927 Guan received his promotion as regiment commander of the General Headquarters of National Revolutionary Army, and was then transferred to the 11th division, one of Generalissimo Chiang Kai-shek's most elite units.

In September 1928, Guan was promoted to brigade commander of the 11th division and later as deputy commander of the newly established 5th division. In 1930 he fought under President Chiang Kai-shek during the Central Plains War and was transferred again to the South to attack the Chinese communist forces under Red Army commander Chen Geng in Hubei, forcing them to join the Long March two years later. He was then promoted to command the 25th division because of this accomplishment.

Second Sino-Japanese War
In 1933. Guan received orders from the nationalist government to help General Song Zheyuan to defend North China against the Imperial Japanese Army led by Field Marshal Nobuyoshi Mutō in the Defense of the Great Wall. He personally led an infantry charge against a Japanese position and was severely wounded in the action, his deputy commander Du Yuming took over command of the division. The nationalist government awarded him the Order of Blue Sky and White Sun after the conclusion of the battle. General Guan's unit stayed in Beijing after this clash as part of the garrison and was post in Luoyang in 1935. In 1936, he led his unit into Shanxi province to help the local warlord Yan Xishan to drive away the communist troops commanded by his former classmate Lin Biao and was successful in his mission.

On October 15, 1936, Guan was promoted to lieutenant general and tasked to block a large Chinese communist force commanded by his former classmate Xu Xiangqian, who had been ordered by the Chinese Communist Party to establish a base in Xinjiang, as part of the communist plan to receive aid from the Soviet Union. General Guan again successfully accomplished his mission and Generalissimo Chiang Kai-shek promoted him to commander of the 52nd corps when the Second Sino-Japanese War broke out the next year. Guan led his unit in successive battles against the Japanese Army, which included the Battle of Taierzhuang, Battle of Wuhan, and Battle of Changsha (1939). Because of his personal bravery, he was nicknamed Guan the Brave and the Iron Fist.

In 1938, General Guan was promoted to command the 33rd army, and was promoted to the position of commander-in-chief of 15th army group, becoming the first graduate of the Whampoa Military Academy to command an army group. In 1940, Guan led his unit into Yunnan province, and was put in charge of defend the border between China and Vietnam. However, Guan's relation with General Chen Cheng suffered another setback when he decided to remove Chen Cheng's favorite commander General Huang Wei as commander of the 54th corps because of Huang's alleged corruption. In 1944, General Guan received another promotion as deputy commander-in-chief of the 1st Area Army and was one of the most successful Chinese commanders in the entire war.

Chinese Civil War
Because of General Guan's impressive track record, he was President Chiang Kai-shek's original choice to lead the American-trained Nationalist troops to Manchuria against Communist troops under Lin Biao in 1945. However, General Chen Cheng opposed Guan's appointment as security commander of Manchuria because of the intense rivalry between the two of them, and Guan was appointed as garrison commander of Yunnan instead. On November 25, college students went on strike in Kunming to protest the resumption of the Chinese Civil War. Four days later, General Guan held a press conference and stated the government troops has the right to use force to quell the strike, and ordered the students to resume their classes. But on December 1, 1945, nationalist troops and student protestors clashed with each other and there were many casualties on both sides, Guan was made a scapegoat of the incident and resigned his command the next year. In 1947, Guan succeeded President Chiang Kai-shek as commandant of the Whampoa Military Academy, and was appointed as deputy commander-in-chief of the ROC army. In August 1949, the acting president Li Zongren appointed him as commander-in-chief of the ROC army, because Chiang Kai-shek put Guan's old rival General Chen Cheng in charge of Taiwan and greatly favored him, General Guan decided to retire in Hong Kong in that November. He formally resigned his position as commander-in-chief of the army in 1950.

Retirement in Hong Kong
During his stay in Hong Kong, Guan declined any political activities and spent most of his time in calligraphy and Chinese opera. Guan's relationship with General Chen Cheng was very rivalrous throughout their career, Guan maintained a close friendship with General Hu Lien, one of Chen Cheng's ablest subordinates. Guan also formed a closer relationship with his own former adjutant, General Liu Yuzhang when their children married each other. In April 1975 Guan travelled to Taiwan to show his last respect to Chiang Kai-shek's funeral. In 1980, General Guan Linzheng himself died at age 75. General Guan Linzheng and his wife are buried in Rose Hills Memorial Park in Whittier, California. General Guan Linzheng is survived by two sons, four daughters, twelve grandchildren and three great-grandchildren.

References

Bibliography
 Hsu Long-hsuen and Chang Ming-kai, History of The Sino-Japanese War (1937–1945) 2nd Ed., 1971. Translated by Wen Ha-hsiung, Chung Wu Publishing; 33, 140th Lane, Tung-hwa Street, Taipei, Taiwan Republic of China.

External links
 http://www.generals.dk/general_/China.html
 Ministry of National Defense R.O.C
 http://www.guanlinzheng.com
抗日名将關麟徵
青天白日勋章获颁者履历 莫非王土整理

National Revolutionary Army generals from Shaanxi
Chinese military personnel of World War II
Politicians from Xi'an
Chinese anti-communists
People of the Northern Expedition
People of the Central Plains War
Whampoa Military Academy alumni
1905 births
1980 deaths
Recipients of the Order of Blue Sky and White Sun
Presidential Medal of Freedom recipients
Chinese Civil War refugees
Burials at Rose Hills Memorial Park